The Texan brig Archer was a two-masted brig of the Second Texas Navy from 1842-1846. She was the sister ship of the Wharton.  Transferred to the United States Navy in 1846, she was sold for $450.

History of the Archer

Archer was built in Baltimore, Maryland at the Schott and Whitney shipyard. Originally called the Galveston, she was rechristened in honor of Branch Tanner Archer, a diplomat of the Republic of Texas.

She was the last ship of the Texas Navy to be delivered under a contract with the shipbuilding firm Schott and Whitney. She was constructed in Baltimore and was delivered on April 25, 1840. In response to the raids of Mexican generals Rafael Vásquez and Adrián Woll, she was commissioned in 1842.  In April of that year she was sent to New Orleans, Louisiana for refitting and re-arming, most of her guns having been transferred to the Austin  and the Wharton. The Archer was never sent to sea on a major cruise.

Transfer to the U.S. Navy
When the United States formally annexed Texas on May 11, 1846, the Archer was transferred to the United States Navy, which in turn sold the ship for 450 dollars on November 30, 1846.

Commanders of the Vessel
The Archer was commanded by:

 Capt. John Clark, 1840 - 1841

References

Naval ships of the Republic of Texas
Ships of the Texas Navy
Ships built in Baltimore
1840 ships